Uranium-236 (236U) is an isotope of uranium that is neither fissile with thermal neutrons, nor very good fertile material, but is generally considered a nuisance and long-lived radioactive waste. It is found in spent nuclear fuel and in the reprocessed uranium made from spent nuclear fuel.

Creation and yield
The fissile isotope uranium-235 fuels most nuclear reactors. When 235U absorbs a thermal neutron, one of two processes can occur. About 82% of the time, it will fission; about 18% of the time, it will not fission, instead emitting gamma radiation and yielding 236U. In comparison, the yields of the most abundant individual fission products like caesium-137, strontium-90, and technetium-99 are between 6% and 7%, and the combined yield of medium-lived (10 years and up) and long-lived fission products is about 32%, or a few percent less as some are transmutated by neutron capture. Caesium-135 is the most notable "absent fission product", as it is found far more in nuclear fallout than in spent nuclear fuel since its parent nuclide Xenon-135 is the strongest known neutron poison.

The second-most used fissile isotope plutonium-239 can also fission or not fission on absorbing a thermal neutron. The product plutonium-240 makes up a large proportion of reactor-grade plutonium (plutonium recycled from spent fuel that was originally made with enriched natural uranium and then used once in an LWR). 240Pu decays with a half-life of 6561 years into 236U. In a closed nuclear fuel cycle, most 240Pu will be fissioned (possibly after more than one neutron capture) before it decays, but 240Pu discarded as nuclear waste will decay over thousands of years. As  has a shorter half life than  the grade of any sample of plutonium mostly composed of those two isotopes will slowly increase while the total amount of plutonium in the sample will slowly decrease over centuries and millennia. Alpha decay of  will yield uranium-236 while  decays to uranium-235.

While the largest part of uranium-236 has been produced by neutron capture in nuclear power reactors, it is for the most part stored in nuclear reactors and waste repositories. The most significant contribution to uranium-236 abundance in the environment is the 238U(n,3n)236U reaction by fast neutrons in thermonuclear weapons. The A-bomb testing of the 1940s, 1950s, and 1960s has raised the environmental abundance levels significantly above the expected natural levels.

Destruction and decay
236U, on absorption of a thermal neutron, does not undergo fission, but becomes 237U, which quickly undergoes beta decay to 237Np. However, the neutron capture cross section of 236U is low, and this process does not happen quickly in a thermal reactor. Spent nuclear fuel typically contains about 0.4% 236U. With a much greater cross-section, 237Np may eventually absorb another neutron and become 238Np, which quickly beta decays to plutonium-238 (another non-fissile isotope).

236U and most other actinides are fissionable by fast neutrons in a nuclear bomb or a fast neutron reactor. A small number of fast reactors have been in research use for decades, but widespread use for power production is still in the future.

Uranium-236 alpha decays with a half-life of 23.420 million years to thorium-232. It is longer-lived than any other artificial actinides or fission products produced in the nuclear fuel cycle. (Plutonium-244, which has a half-life of 80 million years, is not produced in significant quantity by the nuclear fuel cycle, and the longer-lived uranium-235, uranium-238, and thorium-232 occur in nature.)

Difficulty of separation
Unlike plutonium, minor actinides, fission products, or activation products, chemical processes cannot separate 236U from 238U, 235U, 232U or other uranium isotopes. It is even difficult to remove with isotopic separation, as low enrichment will concentrate not only the desirable 235U and 233U but the undesirable 236U, 234U and 232U. On the other hand, 236U in the environment cannot separate from 238U and concentrate separately, which limits its radiation hazard in any one place.

Contribution to radioactivity of reprocessed uranium

The half-life of 238U is about 190 times as long as that of 236U; therefore, 236U should have about 190 times as much specific activity. That is, in reprocessed uranium with 0.5% 236U, the 236U and 238U will produce about the same level of radioactivity. (235U contributes only a few percent.)

The ratio is less than 190 when the decay products of each are included. The decay chain of uranium-238 to uranium-234 and eventually lead-206 involves emission of eight alpha particles in a time (hundreds of thousands of years) short compared to the half-life of 238U, so that a sample of 238U in equilibrium with its decay products (as in natural uranium ore) will have eight times the alpha activity of 238U alone. Even purified natural uranium where the post-uranium decay products have been removed will contain an equilibrium quantity of 234U and therefore about twice the alpha activity of pure 238U. Enrichment to increase 235U content will increase 234U to an even greater degree, and roughly half of this 234U will survive in the spent fuel. On the other hand, 236U decays to thorium-232 which has a half-life of 14 billion years, equivalent to a decay rate only 31.4% as great as that of 238U.

Depleted uranium

Depleted uranium used in kinetic energy penetrators, etc. is supposed to be made from uranium enrichment tailings that have never been irradiated in a nuclear reactor, not reprocessed uranium. However, there have been claims that some depleted uranium has contained small amounts of 236U.

See also 
 Depleted uranium
 Uranium market
 Nuclear reprocessing
 United States Enrichment Corporation
 Nuclear fuel cycle
 Nuclear power

References

External links
 Uranium | Radiation Protection Program | US EPA 
 NLM Hazardous Substances Databank - Uranium, Radioactive

Actinides
Isotopes of uranium
Nuclear materials